Thomas W. H. Patterson  (1845 – May 31, 1900) was a Major League Baseball outfielder. He played in the majors in 1871-1872, and 1874-1875.

Sources
 Baseball Reference

New York Mutuals players
Brooklyn Eckfords players
Brooklyn Atlantics players
1845 births
1900 deaths
19th-century baseball players
New York Mutuals (NABBP) players